The 1985 NCAA Division II men's basketball tournament involved 32 schools playing in a single-elimination tournament to determine the national champion of men's NCAA Division II college basketball as a culmination of the 1984–85 NCAA Division II men's basketball season. It was won by Jacksonville State University and South Dakota State's Mark Tetzlaff was the Most Outstanding Player.

Regional participants

*denotes tie

Regionals

Great Lakes - Owensboro, Kentucky 
Location: Owensboro Sportscenter Host: Kentucky Wesleyan College

Third Place - Indiana State–Evansville 92, Lewis 78

New England - Springfield, Massachusetts 
Location: Butova Gymnasium Host: American International College

Third Place - Bridgeport 83, Bentley 67

South Central - Warrensburg, Missouri 
Location: CMSU Fieldhouse Host: Central Missouri State University

Third Place - Central Missouri State 88, Alabama A&M 74

South - Jacksonville, Alabama 
Location: Pete Mathews Coliseum Host: Jacksonville State University

Third Place - Florida Southern 108, Albany State 80

North Central - Brookings, South Dakota 
Location: Frost Arena Host: South Dakota State University

Third Place - Northern Michigan 95, Gannon 65

West - Billings, Montana 
Location: Alterowitz Gym Host: Eastern Montana College

Third Place - Norfolk State 90, Eastern Montana 78

South Atlantic - Richmond, Virginia 
Location: Arthur Ashe, Jr. Athletic Center Host: Virginia Union University

Third Place - Virginia Union 78, Randolph–Macon 55

East - Millersville, Pennsylvania 
Location: Pucillo Gymnasium Host: Millersville University of Pennsylvania

Third Place - Millersville 96, California 86

*denotes each overtime played

National Quarterfinals

National Finals - Springfield, Massachusetts
Location: Springfield Civic Center Hosts: American International College and Springfield College

*denotes each overtime played

All-tournament team
 Melvin Allen (Jacksonville State)
 Dave Bennett (Kentucky Wesleyan)
 Darryle Edwards (Mount Saint Mary's)
 Robert Spurgeon (Jacksonville State)
 Mark Tetzlaff (South Dakota State)

See also
1985 NCAA Division I men's basketball tournament
1985 NCAA Division III men's basketball tournament
1985 NAIA men's basketball tournament
1985 NCAA Division II women's basketball tournament

References

Sources
 2010 NCAA Men's Basketball Championship Tournament Records and Statistics: Division II men's basketball Championship
 1985 NCAA Division II men's basketball tournament jonfmorse.com

NCAA Division II men's basketball tournament
Tournament
NCAA Division II basketball tournament
NCAA Division II basketball tournament